Bobbie Gentry and Glen Campbell is a studio album by American singer-songwriters Bobbie Gentry and Glen Campbell. It was released on September 16, 1968, by Capitol Records.

The album spawned two hit singles and was certified gold by the Recording Industry Association of America.

Gentry toured briefly with Campbell and performed on a number of American and British television programs and specials.

The album was reissued in the UK in 1983 by EMI's budget label mfp, under the title All I Have to Do Is Dream, featuring new cover art and a slightly re-sequenced track listing, including the duo's 1969 single "All I Have to Do Is Dream".

Critical reception
In the issue dated September 28, 1968, Billboard magazine published a review calling the album "a dynamite sales package teaming the talents of Campbell and Gentry. The duetting on a well planned program of pop hits is a natural for fast programming and top sales. They excel in their blend of Campbell's hit "Gentle on My Mind" and "My Elusive Dreams". The Bobbie Gentry composition "Mornin' Glory" comes up a winner in their reading."

Cashbox also published a review on September 28, which said, "Capitol has combined the talents of its two top pop/country artists and the result is sure to be a profitable sales future. Artistically the pair go together like Siamese twins, and there could be several singles in the set. Our choice is "Sunday Mornin'", the recent Spanky and Our Gang effort, but votes can also be cast for "Scarborough fair / Canticle" and "Less of Me", the latter  a Campbell original. Multi-market airplay and sales on tap."

The review published in Record World said, "Two country folks who recently brought their talents to town and TV and other places, get together for a little hoedown slowdown showdown. Very pretty renditions of "Mornin' Glory", "My Elusive Dreams", "Sunday Mornin'" and "Scarborough Fair"."

Commercial performance
The album peaked at No. 1 on the US Billboard Top Country LP's chart and No. 11 on the US Billboard Top LP's chart. In Canada the album peaked at No. 8 on the RPM Top Albums chart. In the UK the album peaked at No. 50 on the OCC Albums Chart.

The album was certified gold by the RIAA on January 29, 1969.

The album's first single, "Mornin' Glory", was released in October 1968. It peaked at No. 32 on the US Billboard Top 40 Easy Listening chart and No. 74 on the US Billboard Hot 100. In Canada the single peaked at No. 81 on the RPM Top Singles chart. The single's B-side, "Less of Me", peaked at No. 44 on the US Billboard Hot Country Singles chart.

In November 1968, "Little Green Apples" was released as a single in Brazil, but failed to chart.

"Let It Be Me", was released as a single in January 1969. It peaked at No. 7 on the US Billboard Top 40 Easy Listening chart, No. 14 on the US Billboard Hot Country Singles chart and No. 36 on the US Billboard Hot 100. In Canada the single peaked at No. 1 on the RPM Top Country Singles chart, No. 15 on the RPM Top Easy Listening Singles chart and No. 85 on the RPM Top Singles chart.

Track listing
Original release (1968)

All I Have to Do Is Dream (1983)

Personnel
Adapted from the album liner notes.
 Dick Brown - cover photo
 Glen Campbell – vocals
 Al DeLory – producer, arrangements, conductor
 Bobbie Gentry – vocals
 Kelly Gordon – producer
 Tommy Oliver – arrangements, conductor

Chart positions
Album

Singles

References

External links
 [ Bobbie Gentry and Glen Campbell] at Allmusic
 Let Me Be A Little Kinder- poem written by Edgar Guest with the words to 'Less of Me.'

1968 albums
Bobbie Gentry albums
Glen Campbell albums
Capitol Records albums
Vocal duet albums
Albums recorded at Capitol Studios